The Yale Bulldogs represented Yale University in ECAC women's ice hockey during the 2014–15 NCAA Division I women's ice hockey season. The Bulldogs were defeated by Harvard in the ECAC quarterfinals.

Offseason

July 10:Hanna Åström was invited to a second National Team camp for Sweden.
August 3: Jaimie Leonoff and Eden Murray were invited to Team Canada'a Development camp in Calgary.

Recruiting

MD Mafuj Alam Sama hayat Ali khan

Schedule

|-
!colspan=12 style=""| Regular Season

|-
!colspan=12 style=""| ECAC Tournament

References

Yale
Yale Bulldogs women's ice hockey seasons
Yale Bulldogs
Yale Bulldogs